Harold E. Pierce Jr. Brigadier General (USAF, PANG, ret.) (April 4, 1922 – October 25, 2006) was an American dermatologist and cosmetic surgeon who practiced principally in Philadelphia, Pennsylvania for over 48 years. He pioneered surgical techniques for the treatment of keloids, laminar dermal reticulotomy, hair transplants, cosmetic facial surgery, chemical facial peeling, and dermabrasion in people of color. He was called "The Father of Black Cosmetic Surgery."

Early life 
Pierce was born on April 4, 1922, in Philadelphia to Mary Leora Bellinger Pierce and Harold Ernest Pierce, Sr. His mother was a classical pianist who played for Marian Anderson.   He is the oldest of two sons. Their mother died when young Harold was 7 years old and his grandparents, Lillian A. Willets and Warren Wood Pierce of Bridgeton, New Jersey, raised him. While he was still young, Harold was estranged from his father, and as an adult, visited his father in Harlem.  His Father had retired as a Laboratory Assistant from New York State Department of Mental Hygiene.

Advanced Study
After graduating from Bridgeton High School in New Jersey, Pierce received a B.S. degree from  Lincoln University in 1942, and an MD  from Howard University College of Medicine in 1946. Pierce completed an internship at Harlem Hospital in New York City, a residency in dermatology at the Philadelphia General Hospital and Fellowship in dermatology at the University of Pennsylvania's Graduate School of Medicine.

Family life
On November 22, 1945, Harold married Constance Ella Mason, a mathematician and teacher in the Philadelphia school system. They were married for 44 years until her death in 1989. Pierce had three children, and four grandchildren. His eldest daughter became an attorney while the other two followed in his footsteps and became cosmetic surgeons and dermatologists. Dr. Pierce was the first of three generations to attend Howard University.

War Years
In 1951, as the Korean War peaked, Pierce accepted an assignment as the Chief of Dermatology at the 1600 USAF Hospital at Westover Air Force Base in Massachusetts. In 1954, he became a General Medical Officer with the 111th Fighter Bomber. After many distinguished years, he resigned from the Air Force National Guard in 1976 and was promoted in 1987 on the Retired list to the rank of Brigadier General. He is the second African American to be given this ranking.

Pierce was active in the Civil Rights Movement, and even active as a child in the 1930s through his dissemination of Black Newspapers pushing for an end to the terrorizing lynchings of African Americans and their supporters that plagued America throughout the first half of the 20th century.

Author
Pierce is the editor of the book Cosmetic Plastic Surgery in Nonwhite Patients, Grune & Stratton (New York, 1982). He taught for 17 years as an assistant professor of dermatology at Howard University.

Death
Pierce died at the age of 84 in Philadelphia from complications from prostate cancer. He worked daily as a doctor until the age of 83. Over five hundred people attended his funeral.

References

External links
 Biography at NuBody

1922 births
2006 deaths
African-American physicians
American dermatologists
Deaths from cancer in Pennsylvania
Deaths from prostate cancer
Bridgeton High School alumni
Howard University alumni
Lincoln University (Pennsylvania) alumni
People from Bridgeton, New Jersey
Physicians from Philadelphia
Sons of the American Revolution
United States Air Force generals
20th-century African-American people
21st-century African-American people
Military personnel from New Jersey